Kuybyshevo is a rural locality (a selo) in Kruglyansky Selsoviet, Uglovsky District, Altai Krai, Russia. The population was 189 as of 2013. There are 2 streets.

Geography 
Kuybyshevo is located 40 km east of Uglovskoye (the district's administrative centre) by road. Vtorye Korosteli is the nearest rural locality.

References 

Rural localities in Uglovsky District, Altai Krai